Mayumi Ono may refer to:
 Mayumi Ono (field hockey)
 Mayumi Ono (actress)